Le nouveau show is a Canadian sketch comedy series, which premiered as a web series on TOU.TV in 2015 before airing on ICI ARTV and Ici Radio-Canada Télé in 2016. The series was created by the same cast and crew who had previously created SNL Québec, after that show was cancelled by Télé-Québec earlier in 2015.

The show's core cast members are Katherine Levac, Virginie Fortin, Léane Labrèche-Dor, Pier-Luc Funk, Mathieu Quesnel, Guillaume Girard, Mickaël Gouin and Phil Roy. Where SNL Québec had been created as a local adaptation of Saturday Night Live, Le nouveau show dropped SNL-related elements such as guest hosts, musical performers and Les nouvelles SNL, instead restricting itself to a straight sketch comedy troupe format.

References

2010s Canadian sketch comedy television series
2016 Canadian television series debuts
2016 Canadian television series endings
Canadian comedy web series
Television shows filmed in Quebec
Ici Radio-Canada Télé original programming